Tex-Mex is a regional American cuisine that blends food products available in the United States and the culinary creations of Mexican-Americans influenced by the cuisines of Mexico.

Tex Mex may also refer to:
 Tejanos, a name for residents of the state of Texas culturally descended from the settlers of Texas and northern Mexico
 Tex-Mex music, another name for Tejano music, folk and popular music originating among the Mexican-American populations of Central and Southern Texas
 Texas Mexican Railway, often referred to as the "Tex-Mex Railway"
 Spanglish, a language blending  formed of Spanish and English that is called "Tex-Mex" by some Texans
 Tex-Mex (album), an album by Freddy Fender